Kansas Township is one of fifteen townships in Edgar County, Illinois, USA.  As of the 2010 census, its population was 1,003 and it contained 486 housing units.

Geography

Cities, towns, villages
 Kansas

Extinct towns
 Warrington

Cemeteries
The township contains these eight cemeteries: Boyer, Cornwell, Fairview, Harmony, Pleasant Hill, Poulter, Waite and Wilhoit.

Major highways
  Illinois Route 16
  Illinois Route 49

Demographics

Education
Kansas Township contains two schools: Kansas Elementary School and Kansas High School.

School districts
 Kansas Community Unit School District 3
 Shiloh Community Unit School District 1

Political districts
 Illinois' 15th congressional district
 State House District 110
 State Senate District 55

References
 
 United States Census Bureau 2007 TIGER/Line Shapefiles
 United States National Atlas

External links
 City-Data.com
 Illinois State Archives 
 Edgar County Official Site

Townships in Edgar County, Illinois
Townships in Illinois